Deloneura subfusca, the dusky buff, is a butterfly in the family Lycaenidae. It is found in the Democratic Republic of the Congo (from the southern part of the country to Lualaba), Tanzania (from the south-west to Mpanda), Zambia, Malawi and Zimbabwe (the Harare district). Its habitat consists of woodland.

References

Butterflies described in 1933
Deloneura